The Pindiini, also spelt Bindinini, are an Aboriginal Australian people of Western Australia.

Name
The Pitjantjatjara referred to the Pindiini as Wonggai, a term that implies they were given to thievery, wonggai being a word used to indicate mice pilfering flour. The real Pindiini began to object to this Pitjantjatjara exonym several years later, and asserted that they were to be known by their real endonym, Pindiini.

Country
The Pindiini's territory lay north of the Nullarbor Plain, as far north as Loonngana.

Their neighbouring tribes, running clockwise from due north, were the Nakako, the Ngalia due east, the Mirning due south, between them and the Great Australian Bight, the Murunitja southeast, followed by the Nangatadjara and the Mandjindja to their northwest.

Alternative names
 Bindinini.
 Bindunda.
 Wonggai.
 Wongaidya.
 Wongaii, Wonkai.
 Wanggada, Wanggaji.

History of contact
Rumours of a tribe by the name Pindiini first emerged in 1934 at Ooldea in 1934, when a majority of the tribe moved to that location. In later decades, together with the Ngalea, they settled in Yalata.

Notes

Citations

Sources

Aboriginal peoples of Western Australia